Francis Beattie (1885–28 December 1945) was Unionist Party (Scotland) MP for Glasgow Cathcart. Beattie won it at a by-election in 1942, was re-elected in 1945, and he died in a road accident later that year.

References

External links

Members of the Parliament of the United Kingdom for Scottish constituencies
1885 births
1945 deaths
Road incident deaths in Scotland
Unionist Party (Scotland) MPs
UK MPs 1935–1945
UK MPs 1945–1950